Harmony is the twenty-first studio album by Canadian country pop artist Anne Murray. It was released by Capitol Records in the summer of 1987.

The disc peaked at number 9 on the Billboard Top Country Albums chart and sold approximately 350,000 copies in the United States.

Track listing

Personnel 
 Anne Murray – lead and backing vocals 
 Robbie Buchanan – pianos 
 Kristian Schultze – keyboards, synthesizers, programming, bass, electronic drums, arrangements (1-8)
 Mark Spiro – keyboards, synthesizers, programming, bass, electronic drums, arrangements
 K. C. Porter – additional synthesizers 
 Uva Schikora – additional synthesizers
 Dann Huff – electric guitars, acoustic guitars
 Bob Mann – additional guitars (2)
 Paulinho da Costa – percussion (9)
 Marc Russo – saxophones (9)
 Bill Reichenbach Jr. – trombone (9)
 Gary Grant – trumpet (9)
 Jerry Hey – trumpet (9), horn arrangements (9)
 Ed Arkin – arrangements (10)
 Debbie Greimann – backing vocals 
 Bruce Murray – backing vocals 
 Joe Pizzulo – backing vocals 
 Doug Mallory – lead vocals (5)

Production 
 Jack White – producer 
 Mark Spiro – associate producer 
 Balmur Ltd. – executive producer, management 
 Kristian Schultze – engineer 
 Jon Van Nest – engineer 
 Ken Friesen – lead vocal recording, mixing 
 Jürgen Koppers – mixing 
 Jan Krause – assistant engineer 
 Stephen Krause – assistant engineer
 Scott Purdy – assistant engineer
 Rick Starks – assistant engineer
 Brian Gardner – mastering 
 Paul Cade – art direction, design 
 Shin Sugino – photography 
 Lee Kinoshita-Bevington – wardrobe design
 Sheila Yakimov – hair stylist 
 George Abbott – make-up 
 Leonard T. Rambeau – management

Studios
 Recorded at D.I Musikstudio Kristian Schultze (Munich, Germany); Eastern Sound (Toronto, Ontario, Canada); Image Recording Studios (Los Angeles, California, USA).
 Mixed at Paradise Studio (Munich, Germany) and Manta Sound (Toronto, Ontario, Canada).
 Mastered at Bernie Grundman Mastering (Hollywood, California, USA).

Chart performance

References

1987 albums
Anne Murray albums
Capitol Records albums
Albums produced by Jack White (music producer)